Verchocq is a commune in the Pas-de-Calais department in the Hauts-de-France region of France.

Geography
Verchocq is located 15 miles (24 km) northeast of Montreuil-sur-Mer at the D129 and D148 road junction.

Population

Places of interest
 The Château, dating from the nineteenth century
 The remains of an earlier castle.
 The  church of St.Martin, dating from the seventeenth century.
 Two chapels and another church in the hamlet of Rollez.

See also
Communes of the Pas-de-Calais department

References

External links

 History of Verchocq   

Communes of Pas-de-Calais